Nicolas de Roussel de Préville (born 8 January 1991) is a French professional footballer who plays as a striker for German  club 1. FC Kaiserslautern.

Career
Having joined FC Istres as a youth player in 2008, De Préville made his senior debut for the club on 14 August 2009 in a Ligue 2 match against Metz.

On 23 January 2013, he joined Ligue 1 side Stade de Reims on a 3.5-year contract. He finished the 2015–16 Ligue 1 season with six goals and nine assists.

In August 2016, De Préville joined Lille OSC. In a special transfer arrangement, Belgian club K.V. Oostende (whose president Marc Coucke was at that time a minority shareholder of Lille OSC), bought the player from Reims for an estimated transfer fee of €4.5 million and immediately loaned him out to Lille with the latter having an option to purchase him in June 2017.

On 30 August 2021, he signed a three-year contract with Metz.

In January 2023 free agent De Preville joined 2. Bundesliga club 1. FC Kaiserslautern on a contract until the end of the 2022–23 season.

Career statistics

Club

References

External links
 

1991 births
Living people
People from Chambray-lès-Tours
Sportspeople from Indre-et-Loire
French footballers
Footballers from Centre-Val de Loire
Association football midfielders
France youth international footballers
Ligue 2 players
Ligue 1 players
FC Istres players
Stade de Reims players
Lille OSC players
FC Girondins de Bordeaux players
FC Metz players
1. FC Kaiserslautern players
Outfield association footballers who played in goal
French expatriate footballers
French expatriate sportspeople in Germany
Expatriate footballers in Germany